Victor Ivanovich Nosach (December 8, 1929, Fyodorovka village in Novovodolazhskiy district of Kharkiv Oblast - May 7, 2011 Saint-Petersburg, Russia) was a Soviet and Russian historian, Doctor of Historian Sciences, Member of the Academy of Humanitarian Sciences, Honored Scientist of Russian Federation.

Known as a chronicler of the history of workers and trade union of Russia, he created the fundamentals of the science of trade unions in Soviet Union.

He worked in Leningrad High Trade Union School of Culture, Saint-Petersburg University of Humanities and Social Sciences.

Biography 
Victor Ivanovich Nosach was born in Ukraine, from 1946 - 1952 he served Chernomorskiy Fleet in Odessa.
In 1958 he graduated from Leningrad High Trade Union School of Culture, in 1959 he graduated from National University of Kharkiv Department of History, in 1963 he graduated from the post graduate school of Moscow High School of trade Unions.

He is an author of more than 25 manuscripts and books and more than 300 scientific articles about history of workers and trade unions of Russia, about cultural and educational activity of trade unions.

For more than 50 years he taught in  Saint-Petersburg University of Humanities and Social Sciences, a successor of  Leningrad High Trade Union School of Culture.

He was awarded the Order of Friendship of Peoples, the Order of Honour (Russia), the Medal "For Labour Valour", the medal for Labor Prowess and others.

Died in car accident on May 7, 2011 in Saint-Petersburg, buried  on Volkovo Cemetery.

Notes 

1929 births
2011 deaths
Soviet historians
People from Kharkiv Oblast
National University of Kharkiv alumni
Road incident deaths in Russia
Historians of Russia
Labor historians